Swing to the Right is the sixth studio album by Utopia. It followed the Beatles parody-homage Deface the Music. Swing to the Right moves into hard-edged commentary on corporate raiders, warmongers, political villains, and despicable music industry moguls. There is little in the way of progressive rock on this album, which is limited to its title track.

Recorded in winter 1981 and set for release that June, Bearsville Records was reluctant to release the album because of its political and religious themes. In protest Utopia took this material on the road for a full year begging audiences to petition Bearsville Records execs to release it, even going as far as giving out the phone number and address of Bearsville Records and instructing audiences to ask for Albert Grossman.

The album cover is a retouched and tinted reproduction of a well-known photograph taken at a public burning of Beatles records, which took place in August 1966 in the town of Waycross, Georgia, in response to John Lennon's controversial "more popular than Jesus" remark. The photograph, distributed by UPI and printed on front pages of newspapers including The Savannah Morning News, depicts the burning of the Beatles albums in Waycross in a large bonfire, while in the foreground a boy holds an LP which is about to be thrown into the fire. In the original image, the album the boy holds is a copy of The Beatles' Capitol Records debut LP Meet The Beatles, but on the Utopia cover this has been photographically replaced with an image of the Swing To The Right cover (thereby creating the illusion of an endless regression of the same image). The August 1966 event was promoted by WAYX radio in Waycross and was one of dozens that took place across the country in August 1966 in response to Lennon's remarks.

Track listing 
All songs by Utopia (Rundgren, Powell, Wilcox, Sulton) except where noted.

"Swing to the Right" – 4:21
"Lysistrata" – 2:43
"The Up" – 4:08
"Junk Rock (Million Monkeys)" – 3:13
"Shinola" – 5:21
"For the Love of Money" (Kenneth Gamble, Leon Huff, Anthony Jackson) – 3:40
"Last Dollar on Earth" – 4:13
"Fahrenheit 451" – 2:47
"Only Human" – 5:11
"One World" – 3:24
Some CD reissues include the bonus track "Special Interest".

Note
One song entitled "God and Me" was left off the album, but it is available in bootleg form.
The track "One World" was originally intended for release on ''Deface the Music''. A demo version from that album's sessions exists, and it was played live on that album's tour with slightly different lyrics.

There were 2 revisions of this album before Bearsville would agree to release it.

Initial track list as presented to Bearsville in May 1981 with expected release of June of '81.

Side One
 The Up
 Special Interest
 God and Me
 Fahrenheit 451
 Shinola
 Swing to the Right

Side Two
 Last Dollar on Earth
 For the Love of Money
 Lysistrata
 Junk Rock (Million Monkeys)
 Only Human
 One World

Note
An acetate copy of this first version has surfaced which contains different takes of "The Up", "Swing to the Right", and "One World" than what made it onto the final version.

Second track listing presented to Bearsville September of '81 with expected release of October of '81

Side One
 Swing to the Right
 Lysistrata
 The Up
 Special Interest
 Junk Rock (Million Monkeys)
 Shinola

Side Two
 Last Dollar on Earth
 For the Love of Money
 God and Me
 Fahrenheit 451
 Only Human
 One World

The final track listing (as released) was presented to Bearsville in December 1981 and approved for release in February 1982

Personnel 
Todd Rundgren – vocals, guitar
Roger Powell – keyboards, synthesizer, vocals
Kasim Sulton – bass, keyboards, vocals
John "Willie" Wilcox – drums

Charts 
Album – Billboard

References 

1982 albums
Todd Rundgren albums
Albums produced by Todd Rundgren
Utopia (band) albums
Bearsville Records albums
Rhino Records albums